Efrain Andres Morales Badillo (born March 4, 2004) is a professional footballer who plays as a defender for Major League Soccer club Atlanta United. Born in the United States, he is a youth international for Bolivia.

Career
Born in Decatur, Georgia, Morales joined in the youth academy of Major League Soccer club Atlanta United in 2016. Morales began at the under-12 level but quickly progressed to the under-17 side. After impressing coaches in the youth setup, Morales signed a professional homegrown player contract with Atlanta United on August 13, 2020, which will come into effect on January 1, 2021.

On August 15, 2020, Morales made his professional debut for Atlanta United 2, Atlanta United's reserve team in the USL Championship, against Charleston Battery. He came on as a 22nd minute substitute for Patrick Nielsen and scored his first professional goal in the 51st minute. Despite the goal, Atlanta United 2 lost 3–2.

Personal life
Born in the United States, Morales is the son of a Bolivian father and a Puerto Rican mother.

Career statistics

References

2004 births
Living people
People from Decatur, Georgia
Bolivian footballers
Bolivia youth international footballers
American soccer players
Bolivian people of Puerto Rican descent
American people of Bolivian descent
American people of Puerto Rican descent
Association football defenders
Atlanta United 2 players
Atlanta United FC players
USL Championship players
Soccer players from Georgia (U.S. state)
Homegrown Players (MLS)